Agalychnis hulli is a species of frog in the subfamily Phyllomedusinae. It is found in north-eastern Peru and in adjacent regions of Ecuador.

It deposits its eggs on leaves overhanging temporary ponds, in which the tadpoles later develop. It is an uncommon species that is suffering from habitat loss in parts of its range. It is present in a number of protected areas.

References

hulli
Amphibians of Ecuador
Amphibians of Peru
Amphibians described in 1995
Taxa named by William Edward Duellman
Taxonomy articles created by Polbot